The 730s decade ran from January 1, 730, to December 31, 739.

Significant people
 Hisham
 Mu'awiya ibn Hisham
 Leo III the Isaurian
 Pope Gregory III
 Anglo-Saxon poet Cædmon active

References